Ministry of Religion can refer to the following
 Ministry of Religion (Japan)
 Ministry of Religion (Serbia)

See Also 

 Ministry of religious affairs